The Revolutionary Council (Arabic: مجلس الثورة) was the governmental body that ruled Algeria after the coup d'état in June 1965. Colonel Houari Boumédiène was its chairman from 19 June 1965 to 10 December 1976. Boumediene then dissolved it and served as president until his death on 27 December 1978. The council was initially made up of 26 members, almost all of them were officers of the Algerian People's National Army linked to the Oujda Group.

The members were as follows in 1970:

Moulay Abdelkader
Ahmed Belhouchet
Mohammed Ben Ahmed
Ahmed Bencherif
Bouhadjar Benhaddou
Chadli Bendjedid
Abderrahman Ben Salem
Abdelaziz Bouteflika
Ahmed Draia
Ahmed Kaid
Ahmed Medeghri
Yahyaoui Mohammed Salah
Salah Soufi
Mohammed Taibi

Two of the members of the council later became the President of Algeria:

Chadli Bendjedid (1979–1992)
Abdelaziz Bouteflika (1999–2019)

References

Sources
The Europa World Year Book 1970

National Liberation Front (Algeria)
Political history of Algeria